Fyodor Yurevich (died 1237) was the son of prince Yuri of Ryazan according to The Tale of the Destruction of Ryazan (recorded in the 16th century).

According to the semi-legendary narrative, Fyodor  led the Ryazan embassy sent to the Mongol headquarters on the banks of the river Voronezh. He is killed for his refusal to give his wife Eupraxia as a concubine to Batu Khan:
"It is not good for us Christians to lead our wives to you, the impious king, for fornication. When you overcome us, then you will own our wives. "
Upon receiving news of his death and facing capture by the Mongols, his wife Eupraxia throws herself from the fortress walls, falling to her death together with her infant son Ivan-Postnik.

1237 deaths
13th-century Russian people

ru:Фёдор Юрьевич